Apatity (lit. apatites) is a town in Murmansk Oblast, Russia, located along the Murman Railway,  west of Kirovsk and  south of Murmansk, the administrative center of the oblast. The town is named after one of its most abundant natural resources in the area, apatite, the raw mineral used in the production of phosphorus mineral fertilizers. Population:

Geography
The town is located on the Kola Peninsula, between Lake Imandra and the Khibiny Mountains, by the left bank of the Belaya River.

History
The  passing loop of Bely on the Leningrad-Murmansk Railway was built in 1926 and the settlement of Apatity was founded in 1930. It was classified as an urban locality by the All-Russian Central Executive Committee (VTsIK) Resolution of August 20, 1935, when the settlement of pri sovkhoze "Industriya" was merged into Apatity and it was granted work settlement status.

Many of the early settlers in the Apatity area were former "rich peasants" from several regions of Northwestern Russia, resettled to Murmansk Oblast as part of Stalin's Dekulakization program. Members of certain ethnic minorities were deported to Apatity as well.<ref>M.P. Ilyina, "  Этого забыть нельзя " (This cannot be forgotten), in "Спецпереселенцы в Хибинах : Спецпереселенцы и заключенные в истории освоения Хибин : (книга воспоминаний)" (Special settlers' in the Khibins: Special settlers and convicts in the history of the developments of the Khibins''). The Khibiny Branch of the Memorial Society, Apatity, 1997, pp. 112-113</ref>

On January 6, 1966, the Murmansk Oblast Executive Committee petitioned to transform the work settlement of Molodyozhny in jurisdiction of Kirovsk into a town under oblast jurisdiction called Khibinogorsk and on subordinating a part of the area in Kirovsk's jurisdiction to it. The petition was reviewed by the Presidium of the Supreme Soviet of the Russian SFSR, which, however, decreed on July 7, 1966 to merge the work settlements of Molodyozhny and Apatity into a town under oblast jurisdiction, which would retain the name Apatity. Consequently, the Murmansk Oblast Executive Committee subordinated a part of the territory in Kirovsk's jurisdiction to the new town by the decision of October 13, 1966.

By the November 29, 1979 Decree by the Presidium of the Supreme Soviet of the Russian SFSR, Kovdorsky District was formed from the parts of the territory in Apatity's jurisdiction. The work settlement of Polyarnye Zori subordinated to Apatity was elevated in status to that of a town under oblast jurisdiction by another Decree of April 22, 1991. A part of the territory in jurisdiction of Apatity was also transferred to Polyarnye Zori by the Decision of the Presidium of the Murmansk Oblast Soviet of People's Deputies of May 16, 1991.

Administrative and municipal status
Within the framework of administrative divisions, it is, together with two rural localities, incorporated as Apatity Town with Jurisdictional Territory—an administrative unit with the status equal to that of the districts. As a municipal division, Apatity Town with Jurisdictional Territory is incorporated as Apatity Urban Okrug'''.

Economy

The main employer of Apatity is JSC "Apatit", the largest mining and concentrating enterprise in Europe and Russia. Other employers include the Kola Science Center of the Russian Academy of Science and various state and private enterprises.

Demographic evolution
1939: 4,000
1959: 15,200
1970: 45,600
1989: 
2002: 
2010:

Museums
Museum of Investigation and Development History of the European North of Russia (International Cultural Center of KSC RAS);
Museum of regional studies and history (municipal);
Geological museum (KSC RAS);
Mineralogical museum (The Institute of Geology KSC RAS)

Notable people
Larisa Arap, psikhushka whistleblower
Maxim Kononenko, journalist
Andrey Malakhov, television personality
Fedor Fedorov (ice hockey), ice hockey forward

International relations

Twin towns and sister cities
Apatity is twinned with:
 Alta, Norway
 Boden Municipality, Sweden
 Keminmaa, Finland

References

Notes

Sources

External links

Official website of Apatity 
Directory of organizations in Apatity 

Cities and towns in Murmansk Oblast
Cities and towns built in the Soviet Union
Populated places established in 1930
Populated places of Arctic Russia
1935 establishments in the Soviet Union
Former urban-type settlements of Murmansk Oblast